Wembley Park Cricket Club made just one appearance in first-class cricket, when they played the touring Australians during their 1896 tour of England.  The Australians won the match by 135 runs.  The club was based at Wembley Park Cricket Ground, Wembley Park, which is today covered by the Wembley Stadium complex.

Squad for the match against the Australians
The following players were in the XI that played the Australians:

Charles de Trafford (Captain)
Evan Nepean
Charlie McGahey
Peter Perrin
John Rawlin
Lees Whitehead
Frederick Maude
Frederick Spofforth
Jim Phillips
Thomas Russell (Wicketkeeper)
Harry Pickett

Match scorecard

References

Former senior cricket clubs
Cricket teams in England
Cricket teams in London